After a Million is a 1924 silent film comedy starring Kenneth McDonalds and Ruth Dwyer and was directed by Jack Nelson.

This film survives in the Library of Congress.

Cast
 Kenneth MacDonald - Gregory Maxim
 Ruth Dwyer - Countess Olga
 Alphonse Martell - Ivan Senine
 Joe Girard -
 Hal Craig -
 Jay Hunt-
 S.J. Bingham - (*as Stanley Bingham)
 Ada Bell -
 Victor Metzetti -
 Otto Metzetti -
 Stella Nova -
 Paul Gerson -
 Martin Turner -
 Jack Waltemeyer -

References

External links
 
 

1924 films
American silent feature films
American black-and-white films
1924 comedy films
Silent American comedy films
Films directed by Jack Nelson
1920s American films
1920s English-language films